Mecan is an unincorporated community located in the town of Mecan, Marquette County, Wisconsin, United States. As of the 2020 census it had a population of 752.

Notes

References 

Unincorporated communities in Marquette County, Wisconsin
Unincorporated communities in Wisconsin